Aleksey Mishin may refer to:

 Aleksey Mishin (rower) (born 1941), Russian Olympic rower who competed for the Soviet Union
 Aleksey Mishin (wrestler) (born 1979), Russian wrestler
 Alexei Mishin (born 1941), Russian figure skating coach